The Ministry of Constitution and Legal Affairs is a government ministry of Tanzania that was formed in 2006. The ministry is responsible for creating and promoting good governance, justice, and equality by ensuring universal access to legal services.

History 
The Ministry has undergone a number of name changes throughout its history. Most recently, the ministry was renamed under John Magufuli's first cabinet formed in 2015 to the Ministry of Constitutional and Legal Affairs.

Institutions
 Judiciary of Tanzania
 Attorney General's Chambers
 Law Reform Commission of Tanzania
 Commission for Human Rights and Good Governance
 Registration, Insolvency and Trusteeship Agency
 The Law School of Tanzania
 Institute of Judicial Administration

List of ministers

 Mary Nagu (2006-2008) (1st Minister / 1st female)
 Mathias Chikawe (2008–2014)
Asha-Rose Migiro (2014-2015)
 Palamagamba John Aidan Mwaluko Kabudi (2015–2019)
 Augustine Mahiga (2019–2020)
 Mwigulu Lameki Nchemba 2020-2021
 Palamagamba Kabudi (2021 - Present)

See also
Attorney General of Tanzania
Justice ministry
 Politics of Tanzania

References

External links
 

J
Tanzania